The Tebu Mountain bent-toed gecko (Cyrtodactylus tebuensis) is a species of gecko that is endemic to peninsular Malaysia.

References 

Cyrtodactylus
Reptiles described in 2013